The following is the standings of the Persian Gulf Cup's 2003–04 football season. This season will be the third season since the establishment of the Iran Pro League (Persian Gulf Cup).  Pas Tehran F.C. were defending champions.

Final classification

Results table

Promotion/relegation playoff

Player statistics

Top goal scorers

16
  Ali Daei (Persepolis)
12
  Arash Borhani (PAS Tehran)
11
  Reza Enayati (Esteghlal)
10
  Javad Nekounam (PAS Tehran)
9
  Khodadad Azizi (PAS Tehran)
  Amir Khalifeasl (Est. Ahvaz)
  Mehdi Rajabzadeh (Zob Ahan)
8
  Adriano Alvez (Est. Ahvaz)
  Rasoul Khatibi (Sepahan)
  Iman Mobali (Foolad)
  Pejman Noori (Pegah Gilan)
  Iman Razaghirad (Aboomoslem)
  Bahman Tahmasebi (Paykan)

Participating in international competitions
2004 AFC Champions League
Zob Ahan
Sepahan

References

Iran Premier League Statistics
Persian League

Iran Pro League seasons
Iran
1